Rousoukai (老壮会, The Society for Old Combatants) was a Japanese think tank which attracted participants from both the left-wing and right-wing of Japanese politics. It was founded on 9 October 1918 and continued until 1921.

Members

Left-wing
 Sakai Toshihiko

References

1918 establishments in Japan
Organizations established in 1918
Organizations disestablished in 1921
Think tanks based in Japan